"Lordly" is a song recorded by French DJ and producer Feder featuring the vocals of Alex Aiono. The song was released as a digital download on 20 August 2016 through Atlantic Records UK. The song was written by Hadrien Federiconi and Tienus Konijnenburg. The song has peaked to number 10 on the French Singles Chart and also achieved success in Poland and CIS countries (mostly in Russia, when topped the Tophit chart). The song featured as the theme song of the 2017 World Men's Handball Championship.

Music video
A music video to accompany the release of "Lordly" was first released onto YouTube on 5 September 2016 at a total length of three minutes and fourteen seconds.

Track listing

Chart performance

Weekly charts

Year-end charts

Certifications

Release history

References

2016 singles
2016 songs
Warner Music Group singles
Number-one singles in Russia